The following is a partial list of artworks by the American artist Kehinde Wiley (born 1977).

Partial list of works

Painting

Sculpture

References

Wiley
Modern paintings
Works by artist